Tariq Razouki is a former Iraqi football defender who played for Iraq in the 1966 Arab Nations Cup. He played for Iraq between 1966 and 1967.

References

Iraqi footballers
Iraq international footballers
Association football defenders
Living people
Year of birth missing (living people)